Zaner-Bloser may refer to:

 Zaner-Bloser (company), an American publisher of handwriting and literacy instruction materials
 Zaner-Bloser (teaching script), an American teaching script popularised by the Zaner-Bloser company